Light Years Away is a 1981 film directed by Alain Tanner.

Light Years Away may also refer to:

"Light Years Away" (Warp 9 song)", a song by Warp 9 from the album It's a Beat Wave
"Light Years Away" (G.E.M. song), a song by G.E.M. from the soundtrack to the 2016 film Passengers
"Light Years Away", a song by Joe Satriani from the album Black Swans and Wormhole Wizards